Chippiannock Cemetery is a rural cemetery located on 12th Street and 31st Avenue in Rock Island, Illinois, United States. The word “Chippiannock” is a Native American term which means “place of the dead”. It was listed on the National Register of Historic Places in 1994.

History
Rock Island was in need of a permanent cemetery in 1854. The town's population was 5,000 and the dead were being buried somewhat haphazardly in Bailey Davenport's pasture, which is now Longview Park. The first board of directors of the Chippiannock Cemetery Association included Holmes Hakes, S.S. Guyer, William L. Lee, Bailey Davenport, and Henry A. Porter. In 1855 Chippiannock's founders purchased  on Manitou Ridge and secured the services of noted landscape architect Almerin Hotchkiss to design a cemetery patterned in the rural cemetery style of Mt. Auburn in Massachusetts (America's first garden-style cemetery). Almerin Hotchkiss also designed Green-Wood Cemetery in Brooklyn and Bellefontaine Cemetery in St. Louis.

The property consists of a western slope and the crest of Manitou Ridge. The site features gently rolling wooded hills that climb to a broad plateau. It is located near the midpoint between the Mississippi and Rock Rivers. Hotchkiss designed a system of curvilinear driveways winding around the various burial sections.

The cemetery includes impressive monuments by Alexander Stirling Calder and Paul de Vigne. Many of the monuments reflect attitudes about death and mourning from the Victorian Era. Some of the more memorable grave markers include life-size stone statues, a ship's anchor, a six-ton granite ball, a baby's cradle, the sleeping dog statue guarding the Dimick children, and the mourning woman at the Cable monument.

The Sexton's House is a Gothic Revival farmhouse that predates the cemetery. It continues to serve as the home of the cemetery superintendent.  There are more than 25,000 people buried at Chippiannock Cemetery. The preservation of the cemetery is the responsibility of the Chippiannock Cemetery Heritage Foundation as well as other interested citizens.

Chippiannock was listed on the National Register of Historic Places on May 6, 1994. It was the first cemetery in Illinois to be listed on the National Register.

Popular culture
It is an important location in Max Allan Collins's graphic novel Road to Perdition, which was the basis for the film of the same name, starring Tom Hanks and Paul Newman.

Notable Chippiannock burials

 Napoleon Bonaparte Buford (1807–1883), American Civil War Brigadier General
 Benjamin T. Cable (1853–1923), U.S. House of Representatives, 1891–93
 Ransom Reed Cable (1834–1909), president of the Chicago, Rock Island and Pacific Railroad
 George Davenport (1783–1845), one of the earliest settlers in Rock Island, developed what is now the Quad Cities, and namesake of Davenport, Iowa
 Frederick Denkmann (1824–1905), co-founded Weyerhauser-Denkmann Lumber Company with Frederick Weyerhauser
 William H. Gest (1838–1912), U.S. House of Representatives, 1887–91
 Ben Harper (1817–1887), businessman and mayor of Rock Island
 William Hoffman (1807–1884), American Civil War Brevet Major General
 Minnie Potter (1865–1936), president and CEO of the Argus, a daily newspaper
 Chester C. Thompson (1893–1971), mayor of Rock Island, U.S. House of Representatives, 1933–39
 Benjamin Dann Walsh (1808–1869), First Illinois State Entomologist
 Frederick Weyerhauser (1834–1914), founded the Weyerhauser Company

References

Further reading

 “150 Years of Epitaphs at Chippiannock Cemetery”. Rock Island, Ill.: Chippiannock Cemetery Heritage Foundation, 2006.
 “Passages: A Collection of Personal Histories of Chippiannock Cemetery”. Bettendorf, Iowa: Razor Edge Press, 2006.
 "Chippiannock Cemetery" (Images of America series). . Arcadia Publishing, 2010.

External links
 
 Official website
 Illinois Ancestors Chippiannock Cemetery Headstone Photos
 Some Notable Burials
 

Neoclassical architecture in Illinois
Gothic Revival architecture in Illinois
1850 establishments in Illinois
Protected areas of Rock Island County, Illinois
Buildings and structures in Rock Island, Illinois
Tourist attractions in Rock Island, Illinois
Cemeteries in Illinois
Cemeteries on the National Register of Historic Places in Illinois
National Register of Historic Places in Rock Island County, Illinois
Cemeteries in the Quad Cities
Historic districts on the National Register of Historic Places in Illinois
Rural cemeteries